The following is an overview of the events of 1901 in motorsport including the major racing events, motorsport venues that were opened and closed during a year, championships and non-championship events that were established and disestablished in a year, and births and deaths of racing drivers and other motorsport people.

Births

References

External links

 
Motorsport by year